J. C. Murphey Lake is a reservoir in Newton County, Indiana, United States. It is part of the Willow Slough Fish and Wildlife Area.

References

External links
Fish information Willow Slough FWA lakes and ponds

Reservoirs in Indiana
Protected areas of Newton County, Indiana
Bodies of water of Newton County, Indiana